Jada can refer to:

People
 Jada (given name), a feminine given name derived from Jade
 Jada (biblical figure), a figure in the first Book of Chronicles of the Old Testament
 Ja'da bint al-Ash'at, wife of Hasan bin Ali

Places
 Jada, Adamawa, a town and Local Government Area in Nigeria
 Jada e Maiwand, a shopping center in Kabul, Afghanistan
 Rind Jada, a village in Lodhran, Pakistan

Other uses
 Jada (2008 film), an American drama film
 Jada (2019 film), an Indian sports film
 Jada (band), a pop girl group from Boston
 JADA (sail boat)
 The Jada Kings, an American rock and roll band formed in Minneapolis, Minnesota in 2006
 Jada Toys, a manufacturer of collectible die-cast model cars
 "Ja-Da", a 1918 song by Bob Carleton 
 "Jada", a song written and performed by the Pointer Sisters on their self-titled debut album
 Journal of the American Dental Association (JADA), a monthly peer-reviewed medical journal

See also
 Jadakiss (Jayson T. Phillips, born 1975), African American rapper